The Achang language is a Tibeto-Burman language spoken by the Achang (also known as Maingtha and Ngochang) in Yunnan, China, and northern Myanmar.

Distribution
Achang is spoken in the following locations:

 Longchuan County, Dehong Prefecture
 Husa 
 Lianghe County, Dehong Prefecture
 Zhedao 
 Xiangsong 
 Dachang 
 Luxi City, Dehong Prefecture
 Jiangdong 
 Longling County, Baoshan

The three main dialects of Achang in China are:

Longchuan 陇川方言
Lianghe 梁河方言
Mangshi 芒市方言 (formerly known as Luxi 潞西方言)

The Xiandao dialect (100 speakers; autonym: Chintaw //) is spoken in the following two locations in Yingjiang County, Dehong Prefecture (Xiandaoyu Yanjiu).

 Xiandaozhai , Mangmian Village , Jiemao Township 
 Meng'ezhai , Mangxian Village , Jiemao Township

Phonology

Consonants

Vowels

Syntax
Achang word order is subject–object–verb. There is no dominant order for nouns and their adjective modifiers.

References

Further reading

External links

Bible in Achang
Listen to a sample of Achang from Global Recordings Network

Languages of China
Burmish languages